All I Can Do may refer to:

 All I Can Do (album), a 1976 album by Dolly Parton
 "All I Can Do" (Dolly Parton song)
 "All I Can Do" (Chantal Kreviazuk song)
 "All I Can Do" (Jump5 song)
 "All I Can Do" (The Carpenters song), from the 1969 album Ticket to Ride (album) (AKA Offering)

See also
 "All That I Can Do", a song by the Mighty Lemon Drops from the 1989 album Laughter